Hyvinkää railway station is located in Hyvinkää, Finland, approximately  north of Helsinki Central railway station. It is situated between the stations of Jokela and Riihimäki. It is one of the original stations of Helsinki-Hämeenlinna railway (known as Päärata), which was completed in 1862. With Järvenpää railway station, it is one of two still operational stations of original main track.

The station serves the R, D and T commuter rail lines between Helsinki and the Riihimäki terminus to the north.

References

External links 
 

Railway station
Railway stations in Uusimaa
Railway stations opened in 1862
1862 establishments in Finland